Zarat (also, Zaratbaba-Deresi) is a village in the Ismailli Rayon of Azerbaijan.  The village forms part of the municipality of Çandahar.

References 

Populated places in Ismayilli District